Andreas Avgerinos (1820–1895) was a Greek politician from Elis.

He was born in Pyrgos, now in Elis, one year before the start of the Greek War of Independence. His father was Dimitrios Avgerinos who studied Pyrgioti families.  He was a prefectural leader of Attica and chief of the police in Athens.  He became MP for Elis and interior minister, economy and the navy (1876–1879). Avgerinos was Speaker of the Hellenic Parliament from 1877 until 1879, again in 1881 and his third and last from 1887 to 1890.

He was awarded the Commander's Cross of the Order of the Redeemer and awarded distinction from the kings of Italy and Spain.  He was a member of the Athens Odeum and president of the District Council of the Pyrgos-Katakolo Railway Company.  He has a great interest in nature, demonstrated by his concern for his tree planting on Lycabettus and the parliamentary gardens. In his villa in Patisia he preserved a large flower garden with over 60 kinds of roses.  He died in 1895.

References
Domi Encyclopedia
Vyronas Davos Ta stafidika tis Ileias (1827–1897) (' = The Grapes Of Ilia (1827–1897)), Athens 1997
Vyronas Davos Ston Pyrgo Kai Stin Ileia tou 1821 - 1930 (Στον Πύργο και στην Ηλεία του 1821-1930 = 'In Pyrgos And In Ilia Between 1821 And 1930) Athens 1996
Vyronas Davos Istoria tou Pyrgou Ileia kai 17 perichoron (Ιστορία του Πύργου Ηλείας και 17 περιχώρων = History Of Pyrgos Ilia And Its 17 Vicinities) Athens, 1995
The first version of the article is translated and is based from the article at the Greek Wikipedia (el:Main Page)

1820 births
1895 deaths
Andreas
People from Pyrgos, Elis
Politicians from Elis
Speakers of the Hellenic Parliament
19th-century Greek politicians
Ministers of Naval Affairs of Greece
Ministers of the Interior of Greece
Economy ministers of Greece